Eunoe mammiloba is a scale worm described from the Black Sea from a depth of 0.5m.

Description
Number of segments 32; elytra 15 pairs (assumed). prostomium anterior margin comprising a pair of acute anterior projections. Notochaetae distinctly thicker than neurochaetae, or about as thick as neurochaetae. Bidentate neurochaetae absent.

References

Phyllodocida
Animals described in 1882